This is a list of public art in London, including statues, memorials, architectural sculptures and others, divided by London borough and the City of London.

External links
 
 Public Art Online Bibliography